Johann Sahulka (born 25 February 1857, Deutsch-Wagram - 8 October 1927, Vienna) was an Austrian scientist and professor of electrical engineering at Vienna University of Technology. He discovered that mercury arcs act as a rectifier.

See also
 Mercury-arc valve

References 

1857 births
1927 deaths
People from Deutsch-Wagram
Austrian electrical engineers
Engineers from Vienna
Academic staff of TU Wien